Krasov (masculine) or Krasova (feminine) is the surname of the following people:
Andrei Krasov (born 1967), Russian military pilot
Kateryna Krasova, Ukrainian road cyclist
Marta Krásová (1901–1970), Czech operatic mezzo-soprano 
Vera Krasova (born 1987), Russian model

Russian-language surnames